Mount Tornik is the highest point of the Zlatibor Mountains in the Zlatibor District in southwestern Serbia. It rises to an altitude of 1,496 m.

Geography
Mount Tornik is located 10 km from the town of Zlatibor, the tourist centre of the Zlatibor Mountains. Nearby is the Ribnica Lake reservoir. It is surrounded by the villages of Jablanica, Stublo and Dobroselica.

Tourism

At the foot of the peak is the Tornik ski resort, located at an altitude of between 1,110 and 1,490 m, with three runs. It is equipped with a Gondola lift as well as several ski lifts. The resort was destroyed in the 1999 NATO bombing.

References

Zlatibor
Mountains of Serbia